25th parallel may refer to:

25th parallel north, a circle of latitude in the Northern Hemisphere
25th parallel south, a circle of latitude in the Southern Hemisphere
25th Parallel (magazine), a Florida lifestyle magazine